Attack of the Smithereens is a rarities compilation album by The Smithereens, released in 1995 by Capitol Records. It contains a number of B-sides and rare tracks as well as previously unreleased demos and live recordings.

Track listing
Adapted from the album's liner notes.

All songs by Pat DiNizio, except where noted.
"Here Come the Smithereens" – 0:28
1945 Smith College women's choir
"Girl Don't Tell Me" (Live) (Brian Wilson) – 2:32
Previously unreleased; recorded live in March 1980 at Englander's Bar, Hillside, New Jersey.
"Girls About Town" – 2:48
From the Girls About Town EP; released 31 October 1980; recorded August–September 1980 at Chelsea Sound Studios, New York City, New York.
"Time and Time Again" (Band demo) – 2:31
Previously unreleased; recorded February 1980 at Quality Sound Studio, Plainfield, New York.
"Don't Be Cruel" (Live) (Otis Blackwell, Elvis Presley) – 2:41
Otis Blackwell backed by The Smithereens; previously unreleased; recorded live 1983 at Folk City, New York City.
"Hang Ten High" (Dominic Frontiere) – 2:15
From the various artists compilation album The East Coast 60's Rock & Roll Experiment; released in 1986; recorded summer 1982 at Rock Bite Studios, New York City.
"Tracey's World" (Live) – 4:24
Previously unreleased; in-store live performance recorded 1 October 1983 at Capitol Records record store, Hartford, Connecticut.
"Blood and Roses" (Demo) – 1:18
Previously unreleased; recorded January 1985 at Pat's apartment, New York City
"Blood and Roses" (Band demo) – 3:23
Previously unreleased; recorded 1985 at Pat's Dad's house, Scotch Plains, New Jersey
"Just a Little" (Live) (Ron Elliott, Bob Durand) – 2:43
Sal Valentino and Declan Mulligan of The Beau Brummels backed by The Smithereens; previously unreleased; recorded live autumn 1985 at Irving Plaza, New York City
"The Seeker" (Pete Townshend) – 3:20
B-side to "Only a Memory", released 6 April 1988; recorded spring 1987 at the Record Plant, New York City.
"Yesterday Girl" (4-track home demo) – 2:08
Previously unreleased; recorded 1988 at Pat's house, Upstate New York.
"Poor Little Pitiful One" – 3:33
B-side to "Top of the Pops", released 23 September 1991; recorded during sessions for Blow Up, spring 1991  at A&M Studios and Brooklyn Recording Studios, Hollywood, Los Angeles, California.
"Maria Elena" (Acoustic) – 2:44
B-side to "Blues Before and After", released 24 January 1990; recorded summer 1989 at Rumbo Recorders, Los Angeles; original version from 11.
"You Really Got Me" (Live) (Ray Davies) – 3:46
Ray and Dave Davies backed by The Smithereens; previously unreleased; recorded live 22 November 1991 at Boston Garden, Boston, Massachusetts.
"One After 909" (John Lennon, Paul McCartney) – 3:36
B-side to "Top of the Pops", released 23 September 1991; recorded during sessions for Green Thoughts in December 1987 at Capitol Studio B, Hollywood, Los Angeles.
"World Keeps Going 'Round" (Ray Davies) – 2:40
B-side to "Too Much Passion", released 10 February 1992; recorded during sessions for Blow Up, spring 1991 at A&M Studios and Brooklyn Recording Studios, Hollywood, Los Angeles.
"Behind the Wall of Sleep" (Live) – 4:02
B-side to "Yesterday Girl", released 20 June 1990; recorded 13 December 1989 at National Video Center, New York City for MTV Unplugged.
"Something Stupid" (C. Carson Parks) – 2:46
B-side to "Get a Hold of My Heart", released 18 May 1992; recorded during sessions for Green Thoughts in December 1987 at Capitol Studio B, Hollywood, Los Angeles.
"Shakin' All Over" (Johnny Kidd) – 4:06
B-side to "Top of the Pops", released 23 September 1991; recorded during sessions for Blow Up, spring 1991 at A&M Studios, Hollywood, Los Angeles.
"Rudolph, The Red-Nosed Reindeer" (Johnny Marks) – 3:03
Released as promotion only CD single on 30 November 1992 and on the various artists compilation album, Classic Rockin' Christmas, in 1993; recorded summer 1992 at the Chicago Recording Company, Chicago, Illinois.
"Ruler of My Heart" (Naomi Neville) – 3:03
B-side to "House We Used to Live In", released 1988; recorded during sessions for Green Thoughts in December 1987 at Capitol Studio B, Hollywood, Los Angeles.
"It Don't Come Easy" (Richard Starkey) – 3:12
B-side to "Too Much Passion", released 10 February 1992; recorded during sessions for Blow Up, spring 1991 at A&M Studios and Brooklyn Recording Studios, Hollywood, Los Angeles.
"Lust For Life" (Iggy Pop, David Bowie) – 5:08
B-side to "Only a Memory", released 1988; recorded during sessions for Green Thoughts in December 1987 at Capitol Studio B, Hollywood, Los Angeles.
"Like Someone in Love" – 3:59
B-side to "A Girl Like You", released 18 October 1989; recorded during sessions for 11, spring-summer 1989 at American Recorders and Rumbo Recorders, Los Angeles.
"A Girl Like You" (Strip Club Version) – 3:29
B-side to "A Girl Like You", released 18 October 1989; recorded summer 1989 at Crystal Studios, New York City.

Personnel
Adapted from the album's liner notes and Discogs.
The Smithereens
Pat DiNizio – lead vocals, guitar
Jim Babjak – guitar, vocals, co-lead vocals (16), lead vocals (17), drums (26)
Dennis Diken – drums, vocals, lead vocals (2)
Mike Mesaros – bass, vocals

Additional musicians
Ken Jones – bass (2, 4)
Otis Blackwell  – lead vocals (5)
Sal Valentino – lead vocals (10) 
Declan Mulligan – guitar (10)
Ray Davies – lead vocals, guitar (15)
Dave Davies – guitar (15)
Kenny Margolis – accordion (14), electric piano (16), piano (23)
Graham Parker – lead vocals (18)
Marti Jones – co-lead vocal (19) 
Don Dixon – piano (22)
Ray Anderson – trombone (26)
Michael 'Tone' Hamilton – guitar (26)

Technical
The Smithereens – production (3, 4, 6, 11, 13, 17, 20, 23, 26)
Andy Shernoff – production (6)
Jim T. Bradt – recorded by (7)
Ed Stasium – production (13, 14, 20, 25)
Don Dixon – production (16, 19, 22, 24)
Michael 'Tone' Hamilton – production (17, 23)
Kevin Reeves – mastering
Wayne Watkins – project director
Cheryl Pawelski – compilation producer, compiled by 
Dan Stout – sonic restoration
Tommy Steele – art direction
Everett Peck – illustrations
Jeffrey Fey – design
Pat DiNizio – liner notes
Dennis Diken – liner notes

References

External links 
 Attack of The Smithereens on Discogs.com. Retrieved on 30 January 2018.

The Smithereens albums
1995 compilation albums
Albums produced by Don Dixon (musician)